Claude Bénard (born 6 October 1926) is a French former athlete. He competed in the men's high jump at the 1948 Summer Olympics and the 1952 Summer Olympics.

References

External links
 

1926 births
Living people
Athletes (track and field) at the 1948 Summer Olympics
Athletes (track and field) at the 1952 Summer Olympics
French male high jumpers
Olympic athletes of France
Athletes from Paris
20th-century French people
21st-century French people